Mtendere, formerly known as Chainama Hills, is a township of Lusaka, Zambia, founded in 1967. The name means "Peace"in the native language.

References

Populated places in Lusaka Province